Saraswati, or Sarasvati, is a Hindu goddess. 

Saraswati or Sarasvati may also refer to:

People
 Saraswati Vidyardhi, an Indian singer
 Saraswati Saha, an Indian sprinter
 Saraswati Devi (music director) (1912–1980), Indian director of music and score composer
 Saraswati Devi (scholar), Telugu scholar and poet
 Saraswati Devi, daughter of Tansen
 Isyana Sarasvati (born 1993), Indonesian singer

Other uses
 Sarasvati Productions, a Canadian theatre company
 Sarasvati River
 Saraswati Supercluster, an astronomical object
 Saraswati veena, a musical instrument